Dobrómyl’ is a city in Sambir Raion, Lviv Oblast, Ukraine. It is located some 5 kilometers from the border with Poland. It hosts the administration of Dobromyl urban hromada, one of the hromadas of Ukraine. Population: .

History

Dobromyl was first mentioned in 1374, as a settlement founded by the Herburt family, upon request of Polish prince Władysław Opolczyk. In 1566 it was granted Magdeburg rights by the King Sigismund I the Old. Eighteen years later, Stanislaw Herburt built a castle here, the town also had a printing shop, where in 1612 the Annales seu cronici incliti regni Poloniae (The Annals of Jan Długosz) were published. Until the Partitions of Poland (1772), Dobromil was part of Przemyśl Land, Ruthenian Voivodeship. In the course of time, the branch of the Herburt family which resided in the town changed its name into Dobromilski. 

In 1772, Dobromil was annexed by the Habsburg Empire, and until 1918 belonged to Austrian Galicia. After World War I, the town returned to Poland, and in the Second Polish Republic, was the seat of a county in Lwów Voivodeship. In 1921 its population was 5386. Following the Nazi and Soviet Invasion of Poland (September 1939), Dobromil was transferred to the Soviet Union. In June 1941, Soviet NKVD murdered here hundreds of prisoners (see NKVD prisoner massacres). 

Under German occupation, Dobromil was transferred to Przemyśl County, District of Kraków, General Government. Its Jewish population was murdered in The Holocaust, and on August 8, 1944 the town was seized by the Red Army. 

Currently, Dobromil belongs to Ukraine. The town has a local office of the Association of Polish Culture of the Lviv Land. Among famous people associated with Dobromil are:
 Physician and major of the Polish Army, Stanislaw van der Coghen, murdered in the Katyn massacre,
 Piotr Geisler, doctor and general of the Polish Army,
 Tadeusz Stanislaw Grabowski, Polish historian and professor of the Jagiellonian University,
 Kazimierz Wisniowski, brigade general of the Polish Army.

Until 18 July 2020, Dobromyl belonged to Staryi Sambir Raion. The raion was abolished in July 2020 as part of the administrative reform of Ukraine, which reduced the number of raions of Lviv Oblast to seven. The area of Staryi Sambir Raion was merged into Sambir Raion.

References

External links
   Офіційний портал міста добромиль
   Official website dobromyl.org

Cities in Lviv Oblast
Lwów Voivodeship
Cities of district significance in Ukraine
Holocaust locations in Ukraine